Ivan Efremov may refer to:

Ivan Efremov (weightlifter) (born 1986), Uzbek Olympics weightlifter
Ivan Yefremov (1907–1972), Soviet paleontologist, science fiction author and social thinker
Ivan Efremov (wrestler) (born 1996), Russian freestyle wrestler
Ivan Yefremov (general) (born 1946), Russian general